Archips infumatanus, the smoked leafroller moth or hickory webworm, is a species of moth of the family Tortricidae. It is found in North America, where it has been recorded from Quebec and Ontario south to Florida and west to Texas and Iowa.

The wingspan is 17–21 mm. The forewings are brown with a large blackish patch in the median area and smaller patches in the basal and subterminal areas. The hindwings are greyish-brown, but paler towards the base. Adults are on wing from June to July.

The larvae feed on Juglans and Carya species.

References

Moths described in 1875
Archips
Moths of North America